Pingu at the Wedding Party (also known as A Very Special Wedding) is a 1997 television film featuring the Swiss (later British) character Pingu. It was originally broadcast in 1997, and was released on VHS and DVD in the UK in 2004. It was broadcast on BBC Two on 27 December 2010 and on CBeebies on 31 December 2010. The voices are given by Italian voice actors Carlo Bonomi and Pietro Ubaldi.

Plot
Pingu is helping Father deliver the mail. Pingu wakes up a penguin to deliver a parcel, but he's puzzled to receive it. Then his neighbor comes out and says it's for her, so Pingu grabs the parcel back and gives it to the other neighbor, who is delighted to get the parcel. The other neighbor on the other hand, gets very angry for not getting mail and shuts the door after yelling in anger. Father then gives the other neighbor more mail, but this time it was an envelope, as it's an invitation to a wedding. Pingu is curious and asks Father about it and he takes out an similar envelope and gives it to Pingu. Pingu is delighted and they go home. Mother was cooking and Pinga was playing until they were shown the envelope. A photo drops out of the envelope as Mother opens it and Pingu picks it up. Mother then exclaims happily that a penguin and a green penguin are getting married while reading the contents of the envelope. Father gets out his and Mother's wedding album with the green penguin friends and shows it to Pingu and Pinga.

Mother and Father go to get a present, leaving Pingu and Pinga at home playing with wedding clothing and drawing pictures for the bride and groom. The parents are shown a remotely operated Roomba, which they decide to get. The cleaner and remote are put on the table, and Pingu is intrigued. Father warns Pingu not to touch the present and Pingu nods his head. Mother then comes in and tells Father that she needs a new hat, so they go out to get one, and leave Pingu and Pinga alone at home again. Pingu touches the control stick, and the parcel moves. Pinga comes over to watch, as Pingu pushes the stick on the remote control full forward. The parcel takes off and hovers like a helicopter. Pingu finds that pulling the stick back makes it land. Unfortunately, when the parcel lands it over-balances and falls off the table, landing upside down and getting dented. Grandpa comes nearby their house and wonders what was going on. Pinga then explains the matter and Grandpa solves the problem by picking the box up and hiding the dent from the parent's view. When the parents return, Grandpa leaves and on the way greets the parents. The parents don't notice the box and Pingu gets anxious.

On the day of the wedding everything is ready, Pingu's family was getting ready and Grandpa put a small box in his pocket before he went. The whole family was in the snowmobile, they heard Grandpa on a hill in skis about to go down. He slid down and accidentally slipped, causing him to fall and break his leg. The whole family rushed as Grandpa was groaning in pain. Then they were all at the hospital, where Grandpa's foot is thankfully in a cast, but he must be in a wheelchair for the whole wedding because of his foot. The guests who have arrived are chatting at the wedding. Father and Grandfather chat to some of the other guests, and Mother and Pinga go to coo over an egg in a cradle being looked after by its mother. Pingu spots Robby, who is there as photographer and is polishing the camera, which is on a tripod. Robby taps the camera and the tripod collapses, which makes Pingu laugh. Pingu is looking at some flowers when he's called over by one of the green penguin family. She introduces Pingu to her son, who is about Pingu's age. The son greets Pingu by making rude noises, swaying from side to side, slapping Pingu on the back and shaking hands.

As it nears the time of the wedding they all go to anxiously look out for the groom, who hasn't yet arrived. The minister keeps looking at his watch. Then crying distracts them; the egg has hatched, and they all go to look at the baby. Meanwhile, Pingu is called over by Pongi's son, and they go and look at the cake. The green penguin and Pingu both naughtily sample the cake, and Pingu patches it up so it's not so obvious what has happened to it. Then the bride spots the groom and the others turn to look. The groom is momentarily distracted when his tie covers his eyes, causing him to crash into a block of ice, which sends him and the bouquet flying. He ends up sitting on the ice next to the bride, who catches the bouquet as it bounces off his head. Later they open the dented Roomba, which goes haywire by sucking up the bride's bouquet, and the groom attacks it with a stick. The Roomba spins its antennae like a helicopter and takes a little flight. It nearly hits Pingu's father, who drops the remote control, causing it to drop down to earth and break. Pingu takes the blame, and the green penguin's son comes and collects the sucked-up bouquet and drops it on the ground. Then he fixes the Roomba and it functions like normal. Everyone is now pleased.

Robby takes a photograph of the wedding party and the bride and groom leave on a sledge. When the family of green penguins are about to leave, Pingu begs the kid of the family to come with his family but Pinga disagrees and they start pulling him from side to side. The green penguin decides that he wants to come visit Pingu. Pingu and the green penguin both jump on the sled while Pinga gets on the snowmobile and they go home as the sun sets.

Release 
The special was first broadcast sometime in 1997 in cooperation with UNICEF. In 2004, the special was restored and released on DVD and VHS in the UK. The DVD also came out in Australia and Switzerland around the same time. On an unknown date, the special was added to Amazon Prime Video in the UK.

Reception 
On IMDb, the special was given a 7.0/10 based on 33 ratings from IMDb users.

References

External links

Swiss children's films
Swiss animated films
1997 television films
Films about penguins
1997 animated films
1997 films
Animated television films
Films about weddings
1990s children's animated films
1990s stop-motion animated films
Animated films about penguins
Pingu